Welcome in Disagio is the fifth album of the Italian alternative rock band Meganoidi, released in April 2012.

Track listing
 Ora esiste dopo non più
 Luci dal porto
 Finestre aperte
 Milioni di pezzi
 Ghiaccio
 Quello che ti salta in mente
 Ciao collera
 Tutto chiaro
 Occhi accesi
 Quasi ad occhi chiusi
 Ogni attimo

References

2012 albums
Meganoidi albums